The TP-70 was a double-action pocket pistol in .22 and .25 calibre, designed by West German firearm designer Edgar Budischowsky, based on an amalgamation of Colt and Walther designs. It was initially produced by Korriphilia in Heidelberg, and later produced by Norton Armaments of Mount Clemens, Michigan, as the TP-22, or "Budischowsky" from 1973-1977; the Michigan models were of better quality than later models made in Florida and Utah.

References

Semi-automatic pistols of Germany
.22 LR pistols
.25 ACP semi-automatic pistols